Estadio Armando Dely Valdés is a multi-purpose stadium in Colón, Panama.  It is currently used mostly for football matches and is the home stadium of CD Árabe Unido.

The stadium holds 4,000 people, and is named after former Panamanian footballer, Armando Dely Valdés.

Football venues in Panama
Buildings and structures in Colón, Panama
Multi-purpose stadiums in Panama
Buildings and structures in Colón Province
C.D. Árabe Unido

The stadium first opened its gates in 1970, but was later expanded to accommodate more audiences in 2007.